Polana is a settlement in the Municipality of Hoče–Slivnica in northeastern Slovenia. It lies in the eastern part of the Pohorje Hills. The area is part of the traditional region of Styria. The municipality is now included in the Drava Statistical Region.

References

External links
Polana on Geopedia

Populated places in the Municipality of Hoče-Slivnica